The Frazier Quarry Inc. (TFQ) is a large family-owned quarry and stone product retailer based in the United States. The company is headquartered in Harrisonburg, Virginia in the Shenandoah Valley. It is the only producer of Shenandoah Valley Bluestone. They also provide crushed stone and retail products. Founded in 1915 as Betts Quarry, it was renamed in 1946 to The Frazier Quarry Incorporated. The company is a family owned business and derives its name from the owners (Frazier). TFQ markets its products under its own brand name as well as under the name Stonewall Grey, which is for products cut and sold on location.

History 
Beginning in 1915, TFQ has been a prominent business serving the Shenandoah Valley. The quarry was founded to function as a cornerstone to the region by providing crushed stone for new construction projects and helping to expedite the growth of the Shenandoah Valley. Production of crushed stone from TFQ has remained a mainstay in construction projects in the area. The quarry has also begun other initiatives to supply the Valley with stone products. Most notably, the production of “The Valley’s Own Bluestone” has helped to resurrect the region’s  Bluestone construction by providing it from a local source. Other aspects of TFQ's expansion are largely Do-It-Yourself (DIY) outdoor living or landscaping projects, which do not require professional installation. These projects include landscaping stone, stone fire pits/fountain kits, flagstone, and solid stone garden benches.

Historical Innovation 
Bluestone is an identifying characteristic of Shenandoah Valley architecture, and can be seen in the buildings erected by the Valley's earliest European settlers, who quarried the stone from their own lands to construct foundations and chimneys. Architects from the area have historically used bluestone in the construction of major universities and historical sites across the Valley, including the "Bluestone Campus” of James Madison University, the Virginia Military Institute, Washington and Lee University, Belle Grove Plantation, and the Stonewall Jackson Home. In recent decades, bluestone construction has become less prevalent due to difficulty sourcing the material from nearby sites. In response, TFQ aims to provide affordable bluestone locally.

Community Involvement 
TFQ donates time and resources annually in sponsorship of schools and universities in the Harrisonburg and Rockinham Counties. These contributions include a stone garden gifted to the local public television station, Stonewall Grey Split-Faced Stone donated to the Harrisonburg Liberty Park, a stone fountain gifted to the Harrisonburg Visitor's Center, an inscribed Stonewall Grey Garden Bench provided to Harrisonburg High School, and corporate sponsorship of local charity events and projects. TFQ also provides guided tours of the quarry to students from across the Shenandoah Valley.

Environmental Consciousness 
The quarry aims to reduce fuel consumption by promoting use of local stone. TFQ stone products may also be utilized in the construction of LEED-certified (Leadership in Energy and Environmental Design) facilities, in concert with energy efficient systems. Stone such as that from the Frazier Quarry has increasingly been recognized as suitable material for environmental remediation projects involving stream bank fortification, erosion control, and soil stabilization.

Examples of environmental projects include:

Land Reclamation - Re-filling, re-grading, and re-vegetating stone extraction sites, creating parks, school grounds, agricultural land, arboretums, etc.
 Wildlife Preservation – TFQ preserves the natural habitats of the plant and animal life in the areas immediately surrounding mining operations. These buffer zones serve as de facto preserves for local wildlife, as trespassers, hunting, and vehicles are prohibited.
 Erosion Control - Large stone boulders "Rip Rap", help prevent and control erosion, protect stream banks, and slow floodwaters.
 AgLime -  AgLime, a powdery byproduct of processing crushed stone (high in calcium and magnesium) is spread over fields in order to stabilize soil chemistry and increase crop yield.
 Low-Emission Machinery – TFQ's low-emission quarry machinery utilizes ACERT engines, which adhere to the Environmental Protection Agency’s required Tier 2 and Tier 3 restriction, while improving performance, durability, and fuel efficiency.
 Recycling Oil – TFQ collects waste hydrocarbons and lubricants from the heavy machinery involved in the quarrying process and burns them in specially-designed furnaces for heat.

References

 The Frazier Quarry
 Court Days Festival
 Shenandoah Valley Business Newsletter
 James Madison University
 Frazier Quarry Online Store
 "Through the Generations with The Frazier Quarry." Stone Review Oct 1992: 14-16.
 Kushner, Cathy. Science in the Quarry." Daily News and Record [Harrisonburg] 15 Jul 1995
 Reilly, Micheal. "Scouts Aid SPCA." Daily News and Record [Harrisonburg] 06 Mar 1995
 Reilly, Micheal. "Stream Restoration Continues." Daily News and Record [Harrisonburg] 06 Sep 1994
 Puckett, Bettina. "Etched in Bronze: Frazier Quarry Donation Recognized by Smithsonian Museum." Daily News and Record [Harrisonburg] 11 Nov 1999

American companies established in 1915
Quarries in the United States
Family-owned companies of the United States